The 2021 Porsche Carrera Cup France was the 35th season of the Porsche Carrera Cup France. The season will begin at Magny-Cours on 7 May and end at Portimao on 24 October. Races were held in France, Belgium, Italy, Spain and Portugal. This will be the first season that the new Porsche 911 GT3 Cup (Type 992) will be used by all competitors.

Calendar

Entry List

See also

 2021 Porsche Supercup

Notes

References

External links 

 

Porsche Carrera Cup France
Porsche Carrera Cup France
Porsche Carrera Cup seasons